Antonio Sánchez Valdés, also known as Antón, was a Spanish former footballer who played as a forward.
He´s the fourth highest scorer in Real Oviedo history in Primera División.

References

External links

1914 births
2005 deaths
People from Oviedo
Spanish footballers
Footballers from Asturias
Association football forwards
La Liga players
Real Oviedo players
Real Zaragoza players
Real Oviedo Vetusta managers
Real Oviedo managers
Spanish football managers